Oedaleus abruptus is a species of band-winged grasshopper in the family Acrididae. It is found in Indomalaya and eastern Asia.

References

External links

 

Oedipodinae
Orthoptera of Asia
Insects described in 1815